Balcani is a commune in Bacău County, Western Moldavia, Romania. It is composed of four villages: Balcani, Frumoasa, Ludași and Schitu Frumoasa.

References

Communes in Bacău County
Localities in Western Moldavia